Tilden Township may refer to:

 Tilden Township, Cherokee County, Iowa
 Tilden Township, Osborne County, Kansas
 Tilden Township, Marquette County, Michigan
 Tilden Township, Polk County, Minnesota
 Tilden Township, Berks County, Pennsylvania

See also 
 Tilden (disambiguation)